Wolfrum is a surname. Notable people with the surname include:

 Chet Wolfrum (1910-1973) American politician
 Rüdiger Wolfrum (born 1941), German professor of international law at the Heidelberg University Faculty of Law and director emeritus
 Walter Wolfrum (1923-2010), German World War II fighter ace 
 William Wolfrum (1926–2007), suffragan bishop of the Episcopal Diocese of Colorado from 1981 to 1988